This is a list of the awards won by the satirical news program The Daily Show.

British Academy Television Awards 
The British Academy Television Awards is an annual award show presented by the British Academy of Film and Television Arts. The awards were founded in 1947 as The British Film Academy, by David Lean, Alexander Korda, Carol Reed, Charles Laughton, Roger Manvell and others.

Critics' Choice Television Awards
The Critics' Choice Television Awards is an annual accolade bestowed by the Broadcast Television Journalists Association in recognition of outstanding achievements in television, since 2011. The Daily Show has won three awards from a total of seven nominations.

Directors Guild of America Awards
The Directors Guild of America Award is an annual accolade bestowed by the Directors Guild of America in recognition of outstanding achievements in film and television directing, since 1938. The Daily Show has been nominated for eleven awards.

Emmy Awards
Awarded since 1949, the Primetime Emmy Award is an annual accolade bestowed by members of the Academy of Television Arts & Sciences recognizing outstanding achievements in American prime time television programming. Awards presented for more technical and production-based categories (like art direction, casting, and editing) are designated "Creative Arts Emmy Awards." The Daily Show has won twenty-four awards from a total of sixty-four nominations.

Primetime Emmy Awards

Primetime Creative Arts Emmy Awards

GLAAD Media Awards
The GLAAD Media Awards were created in 1990 by the Gay & Lesbian Alliance Against Defamation to "recognize and honor media for their fair, accurate and inclusive representations of the LGBT community and the issues that affect their lives." The Daily Show has received two awards from four nominations.

Grammy Awards
The Grammy Awards are awarded annually by the National Academy of Recording Arts and Sciences of the United States for outstanding achievements in the music industry. Often considered the highest music honour, the awards were established in 1958. The Daily Show has received two awards.

Peabody Awards
The George Foster Peabody Awards or simply Peabody Awards is named after American businessman and philanthropist George Peabody, which recognizes distinguished and meritorious public service by American radio and television stations, networks, online media, producing organizations, and individuals. The Daily Show has received three awards.

Television Critics Association Awards
The TCA Award is an annual accolade bestowed by the Television Critics Association in recognition of outstanding achievements in television.  The Daily Show has won four awards from a total of twenty-six nominations.

Writers Guild of America Awards
The Writers Guild of America Award is an annual accolade bestowed by the Writers Guild of America in recognition of outstanding achievements in film and television writing, since 1949. The Daily Show has received one award from twelve nominations.

Other awards

References

External links
 

Daily Show
Awards